Christine Tullis Hunter Davies (born 1959)  is a professor of Physics at the University of Glasgow.

Education 

Davies was educated Colchester County High School for Girls and the University of Cambridge where she was an undergraduate student of Churchill College, Cambridge. She was awarded a Bachelor of Arts (BA) degree in 1981 in physics with theoretical physics followed by a PhD in 1984 for research on quantum chromodynamics (QCD) and the Drell–Yan process while working in the Cavendish Laboratory in Cambridge.

Research and career 

Davies' research investigates the strong interaction and the solution of quantum chromodynamics using a numerical method known as Lattice QCD.

During her career she has held academic appointments at the University of Glasgow, CERN, Cornell University, Ohio State University and the University of California at Santa Barbara. Her research has been funded by the Science and Technology Facilities Council (STFC), the Particle Physics and Astronomy Research Council (PPARC), the Leverhulme Trust, Royal Society and the Fulbright Program.

She chairs the project management board for the Distributed Research utilising Advanced Computing (DiRAC) High Performance Computing (HPC) facility, is a member of the STFC particle physics advisory panel and serves as an external examiner for the School of Physics and Astronomy at the University of Manchester.

Awards and honours 

She was appointed Order of the British Empire (OBE) in the 2006 Birthday Honours for services to science, elected a Fellow of the Royal Society of Edinburgh (FRSE) in 2001 and has been a Fellow of the Institute of Physics (FInstP) since 1988. She was awarded the Rosalind Franklin Award in 2005 and a Royal Society Wolfson Research Merit Award in 2012.

References 

Fellows of the Institute of Physics
Officers of the Order of the British Empire
Alumni of Churchill College, Cambridge
People educated at Colchester County High School
Royal Society Wolfson Research Merit Award holders
Fellows of the Royal Society of Edinburgh
Living people
Scottish women physicists
Scottish physicists
1959 births
British women scientists
People associated with CERN
Fellows of the American Physical Society